Ayke (Äike) is a lake in the Ayteke Bi District, Aktobe Region, Kazakhstan.

Geography
The lake is located on the Kazakhstan–Russia border. The border runs roughly from north to south and the largest part of the lake is in Kazakhstan, with only a small sector in the NW part within Russia. The Kazakh village of Ayke is located on the eastern lakeshore.

See also
List of lakes of Kazakhstan

References 

Ayke
Ayke
Kazakhstan–Russia border
Ayke
Ayke
Endorheic lakes of Asia